Vesna is a 1953 Slovene romantic comedy directed by František Čap. It is considered among the most watched Slovene films. It has a 1957 sequel Ne čakaj na maj ("Do not Wait for May").

Plot
Three brothers, Samo, Sandi and Krištof think up a plot to get hold of maths finals test papers from their professor at secondary school through courting a girl they assume is his daughter. Not knowing her true name, they call her Vesna, after the Slavic goddess of Spring. The professor's real daughter, the attractive Janja turns up for a date with Samo and they fall in love. When Vesna / Janja finds out the original reason for Samo's interest in her, she does not want to see him again, but eventually changes her mind.

References

External links

1953 films
Slovene-language films
1953 romantic comedy films
Films set in Ljubljana
Slovenian comedy films
Yugoslav romantic comedy films
Films set in Yugoslavia
Yugoslav black-and-white films